FC Lokomotiv Yerevan, is a defunct Armenian football club from the capital Yerevan.

History
During the Soviet rule, Lokomotiv Yerevan football team was formed in 1945 after World War II, representing the state railway department of the city of Yerevan. They won the Armenian Soviet Socialist Republic championship in 1963.

The current FC Lokomotiv Yerevan was founded in 2002 and participated in the Armenian First League during the same year. However, the club was dissolved in 2005 prior to the kick-off of the First League season, due to financial difficulties.

In April 2018, it was announced that Lokomotiv Yerevan has returned to professional football, planning to take part in the 2018–19 Armenian First League championship; the 2nd tier of the Armenian football league system. After returning to professional football, Lokomotiv played a friendly on 1 May 2018, defeating FC Ararat-2 by 2–1. In 2020, after the 2019-2020 Armenian First League season was abandoned, Lokomotiv were disqualified and are no longer active in professional competitions.

League record

Current squad

Managerial history
Managers of FC Lokomotiv Yerevan since the club revived in 2018:
  Vahe Gevorgyan (1 April 2018 – 15 December 2018)
  Anatoliy Piskovets (15 December 2018 – )

References

Association football clubs established in 2002
Lokomotiv Yerevan
2002 establishments in Armenia
Railway association football teams
Association football clubs disestablished in 2020
2020 disestablishments in Armenia